Louis "Foose" Clark was an American football player and coach at both the college and professional levels. He played for St. Mary's College—now known as the University of Dayton— from the 1908 through 1911 seasons before becoming their head coach. Clark was also the first head coach of the Dayton Triangles, an early professional football franchise that entered into the National Football League after Clark's playing and coaching careers for the team were over.

At St. Mary's, Clark compiled an overall head coaching record of 12–4–1 in three seasons. Professionally, Clark coached the Triangles to an overall mark of 12–5, including back-to-back Ohio City championships in 1913 and 1914. Clark was also a player on the team during the 1915 and 1916 seasons.

Head coaching record

College

Professional

References

Year of birth unknown
Year of death unknown
American football guards
Dayton Flyers football coaches
Dayton Flyers football players
Dayton Triangles coaches
Dayton Triangles (Ohio League) players